Triathlon at the 2014 Asian Games was held at the Songdo Central Park, Incheon, South Korea from September 25 to 26, 2014. Both men and women competed in individual events, plus a mixed-gendered relay event.

The individual triathlon contains three components: a 1.5 km (0.93 mi) swim, 40 km (25 mi) cycle, and a 10 km (6.2 mi) run. The relay event features teams of four competitors, where each completes a 250 m (0.16 mi) swim, a 6.6 km (4.1 mi) cycle, and a 1.6 km (1.0 mi) run.

Schedule

Medalists

Medal table

Participating nations 
A total of 65 athletes from 15 nations competed in triathlon at the 2014 Asian Games:

References

External links
Official website

 
2014
2014 Asian Games events
Asian Games
2014 Asian Games